Huntingdon, also known as The Meadow, is a historic plantation house located near Boyce, Clarke County, Virginia.  The original section was built about 1830, and is a two-story, five bay, stone I-house dwelling with a gable roof. A rear ell was added around 1850, making a "T"-shaped house.  Also on the property are a contributing pyramidal roofed mid-19th-century smokehouse and a stone-lined ice pit with a late 19th-century, square-notched log icehouse.

It was listed on the National Register of Historic Places in 1979.

References

Plantation houses in Virginia
Houses on the National Register of Historic Places in Virginia
National Register of Historic Places in Clarke County, Virginia
Houses completed in 1830
Houses in Clarke County, Virginia
1830 establishments in Virginia